Dahaneh-ye Ojaq (also Romanized as Dahaneh-ye Ojāq, Dahaneh Ojāq, Dahaneh-yē Ūjāq, and Dehāneh-i-Ujāgat) is a village in Bam Rural District, Bam and Safiabad District, Esfarayen County, North Khorasan Province, Iran. At the 2006 census, its population was 1,160, in 328 families.

References 

Populated places in Esfarayen County